This is a list of hybrid vehicles, including both regular hybrid electric vehicles and plug-in hybrids in chronological order of first production:

Automobiles

Overview by decade

Early designs: 1899-1917

1899: Carmaker Pieper of Belgium introduced a vehicle with an under-seat electric motor and a gasoline engine.  It used the internal combustion engine to charge its batteries at cruise speed and used both motors to accelerate or climb a hill. Auto-Mixte, also of Belgium, built vehicles from 1906 to 1912 under the Pieper patents.
1900: Ferdinand Porsche, then a young engineer at Jacob Lohner & Co. creates the first gasoline-electric hybrid vehicles.
1901: Jacob Lohner & Co. produces the first Lohner Porsche, a series of gasoline-electric hybrid vehicles based on employee Ferdinand Porsche's novel drivetrain. These vehicles had a driveline that was either gas or electric, but not both at the same time.
1905 or sooner: Fischer Motor Vehicle Co., Hoboken, NJ produces and sells a petrol-electric omnibus in the United States and in London, including battery storage.
1907: AL (French car)
1917: Woods Dual Power Car had a driveline similar to the current GMC/Chevrolet Silverado hybrid pickup truck.

Buses

Date unknown

Castrosua Tempus (in use in Barcelona, Granada, Lugo, Madrid, Santiago de Compostela, Sevilla)
Irisbus Hynobis (Castellón) 
MAN Lion's City Hybrid:
Italy: Trento
Portugal: Lisboa and Oporto.
Spain:Barcelona, Cádiz, Madrid, Málaga, Murcia, San Sebastián, Sevilla and Valladolid
Mercedes Benz/Orion VII Hybrid
North American Bus Industries 60-BRT Hybrid
Scania OmniLink, ethanol-electric hybrid buses,  (Stockholm)
Solaris:
Germany: Dresden, Glonn, Hannover, Leipzig and Munich)
 Poland: Sosnowiec and Poznań
 Spain: Madrid
 Switzerland: Lenzburg
Tecnobus Gulliver (hybrid electric and all-electric versions), sold by Hispano Carrocera
Volvo 7700
Chery A3
 Chang’an (Chana) Zhi-xiang 
 Belkommunmash AKSM-4202K

See also

List of battery electric vehicles
List of modern production plug-in electric vehicles
SmILE
Comparison of Toyota hybrids

References

External links
 Best Hybrid Cars (USA)
 Fuel Economy.gov
 2007 Hybrid Cars

 2021 Hybrid Auto Service

Hybrid vehicles
Hybrid